Turumunga is a village located in Patna Block of Kendujhar district in Odisha. The village has a population of 2164 of which 1117 are males while 1047 are females as per the Population Census 2011. The PIN Code of Turumunga is 758046.
 
Turumunga is situated at 26 km from the district headquarters Kendujhar towards Kolkata. Chadheibhol, Rajnagar, Chilida, Khireitangiree, Ukhunda are the nearby villages of Turumunga.

References

Villages in Kendujhar district